

List of Tortuga Recordings releases

References

Black metal record labels
Doom metal record labels